Scleropogon is a monotypic genus of grass which includes the sole species Scleropogon brevifolius, or burrograss. This grass is found in two areas of the world, in North America from the southwestern United States to central Mexico and in South America in Chile and Argentina. This is a perennial mat-forming grass with sharp, tufted leaves and firm awns. This grass may be dioecious, with staminate and pistillate plants growing in separate colonies.

References

External links
 Jepson Manual Treatment
 USDA Plants Profile
 Grass Manual Treatment

Grasses of Argentina
Grasses of Mexico
Grasses of the United States
Native grasses of California
Flora of South America
Flora of Northwestern Mexico
Flora of the Southwestern United States
Flora of the California desert regions
Flora without expected TNC conservation status
Plants described in 1880
Taxa named by Rodolfo Amando Philippi